Karl E. Robinson (October 2, 1902 – September 29, 1999) was a professional American football player in the first American Football League. At center, he played just one season for the Philadelphia Quakers, helping the team win the league's sole title in 1926.

References

External links
 
 

1902 births
1999 deaths
American football centers
Penn Quakers football players
Philadelphia Quakers (AFL) players
People from Westmoreland County, Pennsylvania
Players of American football from Pennsylvania